The 1981 Miami Dolphins season was the 16th year of existence for the Miami Dolphins franchise.  With the retirement of Bob Griese, not much was expected out of the Dolphins. The Dolphins Defense became known as the Killer Bees because of the number of players whose last name began with the letter B; Bill Barnett, Bob Baumhauer, Lyle Blackwood, Kim Bokamper, and Bob Brudzinski anchored a strong team. They finished 11-4-1, as Don Shula reached a milestone by winning his 200th game of his coaching career. In the Divisional Playoffs against the San Diego Chargers the Dolphins fell behind 24-0 early in front of a sold out crowd at the Orange Bowl. With time running out in the first half, the Dolphins desperately needed a score to get back in the game. Out of nowhere the Dolphins ran the old schoolyard hook and lateral play to success. On the play, Quarterback Don Strock threw a pass over the middle to WR Duriel Harris, who lateraled to HB Tony Nathan, who ran the ball in for a touchdown. The play sparked the Dolphins, who came back and took a lead in the 4th Quarter. However, the Killer Bees could not contain Chargers QB Dan Fouts, who tied the game and forced overtime, where the Chargers won the game on a Rolf Benirschke field goal in the 14th minute of overtime. If it hadn't been for the player's strike of the following season (where they went 7-2, which would've put them at the top of the AFC East), this would've been the first of five consecutive AFC East titles for the Dolphins.

As of the  2022 Season, this marks the last time the Dolphins had tied in a season.

Offseason
July 1, 1981: Linebacker Rusty Chambers, the Miami Dolphins leading tackler in 1978 and 1979, died in an automobile accident.

NFL draft

Personnel

Staff

Roster

Regular season
The Dolphins won the AFC East title behind second-year quarterback David Woodley and a running attack that managed 2,173 yards and 18 touchdowns.   In their eight divisional games they swept the Colts and Patriots but split with Buffalo and went winless against a resurgent Jets squad; they tied the Jets 28–28 at Miami then lost at Shea Stadium 16–15.   They won their last four games of the season to finish 11–4–1.

Schedule

Note: Intra-division opponents are in bold text.

Standings

Playoffs
The Dolphins returned to the playoffs after a one-year absence, hosting the "Air Coryell" Chargers in one of the greatest playoff games in NFL history.

References

External links
 1981 Miami Dolphins at Pro-Football-Reference.com

Miami
Miami Dolphins seasons
AFC East championship seasons
Miami Dolphins